'Ayn al-Tineh al-Sharqiyah (also known simply as Ayn al-Tineh) is a village in northern Syria located west of Homs in the Homs Governorate. According to the Syria Central Bureau of Statistics, 'Ayn al-Tineh al-Sharqiyah had a population of 1,135 in the 2004 census. Its inhabitants are predominantly Alawites.

References

Bibliography

Populated places in Talkalakh District
Alawite communities in Syria